Frederick Davies may refer to:
Frederick Davies (GC) (1913–1945), English fireman and George Cross recipient
Fred Davies (1939–2020), English football goalkeeper and manager
Frederick H. Davies (1871–?), English forward who played for Sheffield United
Frederick T. Davies Jr., American scientist and professor of horticulture
Freddie Davies (born 1937), British comedian and actor
Fred Davies (footballer, born 1906) (1906–1978), Australian rules footballer for Fitzroy
Fred Davies (footballer, born 1921) (1921–1961), Australian rules footballer for Carlton

See also
Fred Davis (disambiguation)